The Fall of the Islamic World: A forecast (original German title: Der Untergang der islamischen Welt: Eine Prognose) is a book from 2010 by the German-Egyptian political scientist and Islam critic Hamed Abdel-Samad.

In the book Abdel-Samad claims Islam is over its peak. As root cause, he points to the contradiction that contemporary Muslims do consume the material achievements of modern society, but on a spiritual plane they are not open to much of associated concepts such as freedom, equality and religious criticism in modern society. Moreover, Muslims in the West are largely financially economically dependent on Western social order but despise the underlying moral values. The gap between Islam and society grows and loses its relevance. Adbel-Samad sees a solution in what he called a "post-Koran discourse" a religious-ethnical Islamic revival, but not literally on the Qu'ran word.

References

Political literature
Sociology
2010 non-fiction books
Books about Islam